Thryptomene ericaea is a species of flowering plant in the family Myrtaceae and is endemic to South Australia. It is a shrub with narrow elliptic leaves and white flowers with five petals and five stamens.

Description
Flowering occurs from September to December.

Taxonomy
Thryptomene ericaea was first formally described in 1858 by Ferdinand von Mueller in Fragmenta phytographiae Australiae from specimens collected by "Bannier" on Kangaroo Island. The specific epithet (ericaea) refers to a resemblance of this species to plants in the genus Erica.

Distribution
This thryptomene occurs in South Australia, on Kangaroo Island and to a lesser extent on the Eyre and Yorke Peninsulas.

Cultivation
A cultivar of T. ericaea known as 'Centenary Starburst' was chosen as South Australia's floral emblem for the Centenary of Federation (1901–2001). This cultivar has commercial potential for the cut flower industry but the species is difficult to propagate. Research on inducing root formation in tissue culture has been conducted.

References

ericaea
Flora of South Australia
Taxa named by Ferdinand von Mueller
Plants described in 1858